Jameh Mosque of Namin (Persian: مسجد جامع نمین) is a mosque in Namin, Ardabil, Iran. built during the Qajar dynasty, it is located in Imam Khomeini Street, not reaching the Bazaar.

References

Mosques in Ardabil Province
Mosque buildings with domes
National works of Iran
Namin